Antipterna naias is a species of moth in the family Oecophoridae, first described by Edward Meyrick in 1902 as Machaeritis naias. The male holotype for Machaeritis naias was collected on Mount Crackenback, New South Wales. The male holotype for Ocystola paralia was collected at Brighton, Victoria.

Further reading

References

External links
Antipterna naias occurrence data from Atlas of Living Australia

Oecophorinae
Taxa described in 1902
Taxa named by Edward Meyrick